Gerry McAnaney (born 1957) is an Irish football administrator who is elected president of Football Association of Ireland, succeeding Donal Conway.

Background 
Gerry was born in Dublin but grow up in Rathfarnham, Dublin. He attended the Templeogue College finished in 1975 and began loving football right from his childhood, a fan of Chelsea club, he played in high school and Ranger AFC during the two years of it establishment, although he played for the U-15 in Wales national teams and left the football career to work with RTÉ as Librarian, then he later joined the military which he served as regional director of Military Police and tours of duty with the United Nations in Lebanon till he held a position of commandant in the Defence Forces.

Prior of becoming president of FAI, he contest for vice president which he lost to Paul Cooke and Heraghty held the position of Gerry in the FAI board same day of the elections after being in the board for many years.

Notes 

Living people
Sportspeople from Dublin (city)
1957 births
Football Association of Ireland officials